The current flag of Dallas, Texas, was adopted February 13, 1967. The flag was designed by E. L. Gilchrist.

Design
It is bisected horizontally by a thin white line (a fimbriation, approximately 1/27th of the flag's height) with a dark red top and a dark blue bottom.  A large, white 5-pointed star (approximately 14/15ths of the flag's height) dominates the flag and contains the city seal in buff and black.

Historical flags 
The flag in use between 1916 and 1967 (though it was not actually produced until 1954) was a non-rectangular flag (similar to the flag of Ohio) colored blue, but unlike the current flag, there is no fimbriation. The center of the flag contains the state of Texas in white with a star and the name "Dallas" marking the city's position in the state.

References 

Dallas
Dallas
Culture of Dallas
Flags introduced in 1967
1967 establishments in Texas